RXC J2211.7-0350 is a cluster of galaxies. Galaxy clusters are the biggest objects in the Universe that are held together by gravity.

See also
 Brightest cluster galaxy
 Galaxy groups
 Galaxy clusters
 List of galaxy clusters

References

Galaxy clusters
Aquarius (constellation)